Karingani is a Northwestern Iranian language closely related to Talysh and the Harzandi dialect. It is spoken in East Azerbaijan Province, in the Dizmar district, Keringan, Kalasuri and Khoynarudi villages.

References

Sources 
 

Northwestern Iranian languages
Languages of Iran